Number 617 Squadron is a Royal Air Force aircraft squadron, originally based at RAF Scampton in Lincolnshire and currently based at RAF Marham in Norfolk. It is commonly known as "The Dambusters", for its actions during Operation Chastise against German dams during the Second World War. In the early 21st century it operated the Panavia Tornado GR4 in the ground attack and reconnaissance role until being disbanded on 28 March 2014. The Dambusters reformed on 18 April 2018, and was equipped at RAF Marham in June 2018 with the Lockheed Martin F-35B Lightning, becoming the first squadron to be based in the UK with this advanced V/STOL type. The unit is composed of both RAF and Royal Navy personnel, and operates from the Royal Navy's  aircraft carriers.

History

Between the wars
According to the squadron's entry in Flying Units of the RAF by Alan Lake, No. 617 Squadron was allocated the unit identification code MZ for the period April to September 1939, even though the unit did not actually exist at the time.

Second World War
The squadron was formed under great secrecy at RAF Scampton during the Second World War on 21 March 1943 on Avro Lancaster heavy bombers. It included Royal Canadian Air Force, Royal Australian Air Force and Royal New Zealand Air Force personnel and was formed for the specific task of attacking three major dams that contributed water and power to the Ruhr industrial region in Germany: the Möhne, Eder and Sorpe. The plan was given the codename Operation Chastise and carried out on 17 May 1943. The squadron had to develop the tactics to deploy Barnes Wallis's "Bouncing bomb", and undertook some of its training over the dams of the Upper Derwent Valley in Derbyshire, as the towers on the dam walls were similar to those to be found on some of the target dams in Germany.

The squadron's badge, approved by King George VI, depicts the bursting of a dam in commemoration of Chastise. The original commander of No. 617 Squadron, Wing Commander Guy Gibson, was awarded the Victoria Cross for his part in the raid. Guy Gibson also owned a black Labrador named Nigger, who was the mascot of the squadron for some time but who was run over and killed outside the base on the evening of the raid.

After the raid, Gibson was withdrawn from flying (due to the high number of raids he had been on) and went on a publicity tour. George Holden became commanding officer (CO) in July, but he was shot down and killed on his fourth mission, Operation Garlic in September 1943, in an attack on the Dortmund-Ems Canal; he had four of Gibson's crew with him. H. B. "Mick" Martin took command temporarily, before Leonard Cheshire took over as CO. Cheshire developed and personally took part in the special target marking techniques required, which went far beyond the precision delivered by the standard Pathfinder units – by the end he was marking the targets from a Mustang fighter. He was also awarded the VC.

On 15 July 1943, 12 aircraft of the squadron took off from Scampton to attack targets in Northern Italy. All aircraft attacked and proceeded to North Africa without loss. The targets were San Polo d'Enza and Arquata Scrivia power stations; it was hoped that the attacks would delay German troops who were travelling down into Italy on the electrified railway system to support the Italian front. The operation met little opposition but the targets were obscured by valley haze and were not destroyed. The 12 crews returned to Scampton on 25 July from North Africa after bombing Leghorn docks on the return journey. The raid on Leghorn Docks was not a great success, due to mist shrouding the target. On 29 July 1943 nine aircraft took off from Scampton to drop leaflets on Milan, Bologna, Genoa and Turin in Italy. All aircraft completed the mission and landed safely in Blida, North Africa.

The UK Government considered using No. 617 Squadron to target the Italian leader Mussolini in July or August 1943. The British believed if Mussolini was killed it might take Italy out of the war. It would have been a flight carried out at extremely low level with the targets of Mussolini's headquarters and residence in Rome. Neither of these targets were within 1,500 yards of the Vatican, which the Allies had promised not to damage. However within two weeks of the plan being suggested, Mussolini was ousted by his opponents and replaced by Pietro Badoglio, leading to an armistice with the Allies in September.

Throughout the rest of the war, the squadron continued in a specialist and precision-bombing role, including the use of the enormous "Tallboy" and "Grand Slam" ground-penetrating earthquake bombs, on targets such as concrete U-boat shelters and bridges. Several failed attempts were made on The Dortmund-Ems Canal in 1943 (Operation Garlic); it was finally breached with Tallboys in September 1944.

In March 1945 the squadron used the Grand Slam bomb for the first time, against the Bielefeld viaduct, wrecking it. The viaduct had withstood 54 previous attacks without being permanently neutralized.

The Squadron's skills in precision flying were also utilized in the Normandy invasion, as part of a massive effort to deceive the Germans as to the actual location of the Allied invasion. The strips were dropped in vast numbers, in carefully choreographed patterns, over many hours, to create on German radar an illusion of a huge approaching naval fleet, even though the ships were non-existent. The Squadron practiced the technique at Tantallon Castle in Scotland, using captured German Würzburg, Freya, and Seetakt radars.

A particularly notable series of attacks caused the disabling and sinking of Tirpitz, a major German battleship that had been moved into a fjord in northern Norway where she threatened the Arctic convoys and was too far north to be attacked by air from the UK. She had already been damaged by an attack by Royal Navy midget submarines and a series of attacks from carrier-borne aircraft of the Fleet Air Arm, but both attacks had failed to sink her. The task was given to No. IX and No. 617 Squadrons; they were deployed to Yagodnik, near Archangel a staging base in Russia to attack Tirpitz with Tallboy bombs. On 15 September 1944, the RAF bombers struck the battleship in the forecastle, which rendered her unseaworthy, so she was sent to the Tromsø fjord where temporary repairs were made so she was anchored as a floating battery. This fjord was in range of bombers operating from Scotland and from there, in October, she was attacked again, but cloud cover thwarted the attack. Finally on 12 November 1944, the two squadrons attacked Tirpitz. The first bombs missed their target, but following aircraft scored two direct hits in quick succession. Within ten minutes of the first bomb hitting the Tirpitz, she suffered a magazine explosion at her "C" turret and capsized killing 1,000 of her 1,700 crew. All three RAF attacks on Tirpitz were led by Wing Commander J. B. "Willy" Tait, who had succeeded Cheshire as CO of No. 617 Squadron in July 1944. Among pilots participating in the raids was Flight Lieutenant John Leavitt, an American who piloted one of the 31 Lancasters. Leavitt's aircraft dropped one of the bombs that hit  Tirpitz dead centre. Despite both squadrons claiming that it was their bombs that actually sank the Tirpitz, it was the Tallboy bomb, dropped from a No. IX Squadron Lancaster WS-Y (LM220) piloted by Flying Officer Dougie Tweddle that is attributed to the sinking of the warship. F/O Tweddle was awarded the Distinguished Flying Cross for his part in the operations against Tirpitz.

During the Second World War the Squadron carried out 1,599 operational sorties with the loss of 32 aircraft.

Cold War (1946–1981)
After the end of the Second World War, the squadron replaced its Lancasters with Avro Lincolns, following those in 1952 with the English Electric Canberra jet bomber. The squadron was deployed to Malaya for four months in 1955, returning to RAF Binbrook to be disbanded on 15 December 1955.

Reformed at RAF Scampton on 1 May 1958 as part of RAF Bomber Command's V-bomber force maintaining the UK's strategic nuclear deterrent, the squadron was equipped with the Avro Vulcan B1 from Aug 1960. By 23 May 1961, its aircraft were the upgraded Vulcan B1A fitted with the electronic countermeasures tail pod. The squadron's assigned role was high-level strategic bombing with a variety of free fall nuclear bombs. Both the B1 and B1A types were equipped with various free-fall nuclear weapons. These may have included Blue Danube, Red Beard, Violet Club the Interim Megaton Weapon, Yellow Sun Mk.1 and certainly Yellow Sun Mk2. American bombs were also supplied to the RAF V-bombers for a short period under the Project E arrangements.

Vulcans were configured for the Blue Steel stand-off bomb and 617 Squadron was the first to be declared operational with it in August 1962, until in January 1970 the squadron's eight Vulcan B2 aircraft were re-equipped with the new strategic laydown bomb, WE.177B which improved aircraft survivability by enabling aircraft to remain at low-level during weapon release.

Following the transfer of responsibility for the nuclear deterrent to the Royal Navy, the squadron was reassigned to SACEUR for tactical strike missions. In a high-intensity European war the squadron's role was to support land forces on the Continent by striking deep into enemy-held areas beyond the forward edge of the battlefield, striking at enemy concentrations and infrastructure, with WE.177 tactical nuclear weapons, should a conflict escalate to that stage. The squadron's eight aircraft were allocated eight WE.177 nuclear bombs. As the Vulcan's bomb bay was configured to carry only one, and assuming that RAF staff planners had factored in their usual allowance for attrition in the early conventional phase of a continental war, leaving sufficient surviving aircraft to deliver the full stockpile of nuclear weapons, it is a reasonable conclusion that the Vulcan force was held in reserve for nuclear strike duties only. The squadron's Vulcan B2s served mainly in that low-level penetration role until disbandment on 31 December 1981.

Tornado GR (1983–2014)

The squadron reformed on 1 January 1983 at RAF Marham, re-equipped with twelve Panavia Tornado GR1.

No. 617 Squadron was deployed to King Faisal Air Base, Saudi Arabia following the 1990 Iraqi Invasion of Kuwait, it returned to the UK in Nov 90' replaced by 16/20 Sqn, some of its aircrews did return, operating with various other squadrons throughout KSA.

In 1993, No. 617 Squadron began the changeover to anti-shipping and by May 1994 was operating from RAF Lossiemouth assigned to SACLANT, flying the Tornado GR1B with the Sea Eagle missile. In December 1994, Flight Lieutenant Jo Salter became the first female combat ready fast jet pilot.

In 1995, crews from No. 617 Squadron deployed in support of Operation Warden.

In 2003, the Squadron sent several airframes to the Ali Al Salem Air Base, Kuwait and Al Udeid Air Base, Qatar, as part of Operation Telic joining airframes from II Squadron, IX Squadron, XIII Squadron, 31 Squadron and 12 Squadron (a total of 30 Tornado GR4/GR4A's were deployed) where they were the first squadron to use the new MBDA Storm Shadow.

In July 2009, the Dambusters deployed to Kandahar Airfield, Afghanistan, as part of Operation Herrick in order to provide support for No. 12 (Bomber) Squadron. No. 617 Squadron underwent their first full Op HERRICK deployment between April and July 2011, handing over responsibility to No. 31 Squadron on 15 July. While deployed, the Dambusters were the RAF squadron who helped the Tornado GR fleet surpass 1,000,000 flying hours in June 2011.

In July 2011, the squadron took part in Operation Ellamy

In July 2013, it was announced that No. 617 Squadron would become the first operational RAF unit to receive the Lockheed Martin F-35B Lightning. No. 617 Squadron disbanded on 28 March 2014 as part of the draw-down of the Tornado force.

F-35B Lightning (2017–present)

Beginning in 2016, the Dambusters started their training for conversion to the F-35B ahead of reforming as the first British front line squadron with the Lightning. The squadron worked up at Marine Corps Air Station Beaufort, South Carolina, throughout late 2017 and early 2018 before reforming on 18 April 2018.

On 6 June 2018, a quartet of No. 617 Squadron Lightnings (ZM145, ZM146, ZM147 and ZM148), supported by three Airbus Voyagers and an Airbus Atlas C1, made an eight-hour flight across the Atlantic to become the first of the UK's aircraft to be based permanently at RAF Marham. On 10 July, the squadron participated in the RAF100 flypast over London with three F-35Bs. On 3 August, five more F-35Bs arrived at RAF Marham for the Dambusters. No. 617 Squadron was declared 'combat ready' on 10 January 2019.

The Dambusters underwent their first F-35 deployment on 22 May 2019 when six Lightnings deployed to RAF Akrotiri, Cyprus, for six weeks as part of 'Exercise Lightning Dawn'. On 16 June, No. 617 Squadron carried out the first RAF F-35 operational mission when two Lightnings conducted a patrol over Syria as part of Operation Shader. On 25 June, No. 617 Squadron's F-35Bs participated in 'Exercise Tri Lightning' alongside United States Air Force F-35As of the 4th Fighter Squadron and Israeli Air Force F-35Is of 140 Squadron over the eastern Mediterranean Sea. Four F-35B Lightnings returned home to RAF Marham on 2 July, while the other two arrived at Amendola Air Base to carry out bilateral training with the Italian Air Force, including the local F-35As of 32º Stormo. Three Lightnings departed RAF Marham on 9 October to MCAS Beaufort in preparation for Westlant 19, with them embarking upon HMS Queen Elizabeth for the first time alongside No. 17 Test and Evaluation Squadron on 13 October. 

On 22 January 2020, the Dambusters departed Marham for Exercise Red Flag at Nellis Air Force Base, Nevada, their first with the Lightning. Between September and November 2020, the Dambusters hosted United States Marine Corps F-35Bs from VMFA-211 who deployed to RAF Marham to work up on HMS Queen Elizabeth ahead of the carrier's deployment in 2021.

In May 2021, No. 617 Squadron embarked eight F-35B Lightnings on board HMS Queen Elizabeth as part of Carrier Strike Group 2021 (CSG21), operating alongside VMFA-211 as the fixed wing component. On 16 November 2021, one of the squadron's F-35B fighters crashed during operations in the Mediterranean. The pilot was able to eject safely.

Aircraft operated
List of aircraft operated by No. 617 Squadron:

 Avro Lancaster B.III (Special) (March 1943 – May 1943)
 Avro Lancaster B.I (March 1943 – June 1945)
 Avro Lancaster B.III (March 1943 – June 1945)
 Avro Lancaster B.VII (FE) (June 1945 – September 1946)
 de Havilland Mosquito Mk.VI (April 1944 – March 1945)
 North American P-51 Mustang Mk. III (June 1944 - 1945)
 Avro Lincoln B.II (September 1946 – January 1952)
 English Electric Canberra B.2 (January 1952 – April 1955)
 English Electric Canberra B.6 (February 1955 – December 1955)
 Avro Vulcan B.1 (May 1958 – July 1961)
 Avro Vulcan B.1A (October 1960 – July 1961)
 Avro Vulcan B.2 (September 1961 – December 1981)
 Panavia Tornado GR1 (January 1983 – April 1994)
 Panavia Tornado GR1B (April 1994 – 2002)
 Panavia Tornado GR4 (2002 – January 2014)
 Lockheed Martin F-35B Lightning (December 2017 – present)

Battle honours 
No. 617 Squadron has received the following battle honours. Those marked with an asterisk (*) may be emblazoned on the squadron standard.

 Fortress Europe (1943–1945)*
 The Dams (1943)*
 Biscay Ports (1944)*
 France and Germany (1944–1945)*
 Normandy (1944)*
 Tirpitz*

 Channel & North Sea (1944–1945)*
 German Ports (1945)*
 Gulf (1991)
 Afghanistan (2001–2014)
 Iraq (2003–2011)

Commanding officers

The following men have commanded No. 617 Squadron:

1943–1955
March 1943, Wing Commander Guy Gibson
August 1943, Wing Commander George Holden
September 1943 Squadron Leader Harold Martin
November 1943, Wing Commander Leonard Cheshire
July 1944, Wing Commander James Brian Tait
December 1944, Wing Commander John Emilius Fauquier
April 1945, Wing Commander John Grindon
June 1945, Wing Commander C Fothergill
April 1946, Squadron Leader C K Saxelby
May 1947, Wing Commander C D Milne (for goodwill visit to USA)
July 1947, Squadron Leader C K Saxelby
February 1948, Squadron Leader P G Brodie
May 1950, Squadron Leader W H Thallon
June 1952, Squadron Leader M J O'Bryen-Nichols
Dec 1952, Squadron Leader D Roberts
May 1954, Squadron Leader J A Ruck (Squadron disbanded December 1955)

1958–1981
May 1958, Wing Commander D Bower (Squadron reformed with Vulcans)
May 1960, Wing Commander L G A Bastard
December 1962, Wing Commander H G Currell
March 1965, Wing Commander D G L Heywood
March 1967, Wing Commander R C Allen
March 1969, Wing Commander C A Vasey
March 1971, Wing Commander F M A Hines
October 1973, Wing Commander V L Warrington
September 1975, Wing Commander R B Gilvary
July 1977, Wing Commander F Mason (brief tenure due to illness)
July 1977, Wing Commander J N Stephenson-Oliver
August 1979, Wing Commander J N Herbertson (Squadron disbanded December 1981)

1983–2014
January 1983, Wing Commander A J Harrison (Squadron reformed with Tornados)
June 1985, Wing Commander P J J Day
January 1988, Wing Commander N J Day
May 1990, Wing Commander R D Iveson
March 1993, Wing Commander J H Dickinson
July 1995, Wing Commander I L Dugmore
March 1998, Wing Commander G E Thwaites
September 2000, Wing Commander D G Robertson
July 2003, Wing Commander A Monkman
January 2006, Wing Commander S P Rochelle
January 2008, Wing Commander D J E Cooper
October 2010, Wing Commander K D Taylor
October 2012, Wing Commander D S Arthurton (Squadron disbanded 2014)

2017-Present
December 2017,  Wing Commander J R Butcher (Squadron reformed with F-35 Lightnings)
April 2020, Commander Mark Sparrow (Squadron commanded by a Royal Navy officer for the first time in its history)
13 May 2022, Wing Commander Dave Tait (Commander Sparrow leaves on promotion to Captain Air Group HMS Queen Elizabeth)

In popular culture
The Second World War exploits of the squadron and Chastise in particular, were described in Guy Gibson's own 1944 account Enemy Coast Ahead, as well as Paul Brickhill's 1951 book The Dam Busters and a 1955 film, though the accuracy and completeness of these accounts were compromised by many of the documents relating to the war years still being secured by the Official Secrets Act. The definitive work however is considered The Dambusters Raid by John Sweetman.

In 2006, it was announced that New Zealand film director Peter Jackson and David Frost would co-produce a re-make of the film. It was scripted by Stephen Fry, and intended to be directed by Christian Rivers. The last living Dam Buster pilot at the time, New Zealander Les Munro (1919–2015), offered his services as a technical adviser.

See also
 List of Royal Air Force aircraft squadrons
 Operation Chastise, the attack by 617 Squadron on German dams during the Second World War
 Operation Garlic, an attack by 617 Squadron on the Dortmund-Ems Canal.
 Operation Catechism, the sinking of German battleship Tirpitz by 617 Squadron
 Enemy Coast Ahead a book by Guy Gibson written in 1944 shortly before his death
 The Dam Busters a 1951 book by Paul Brickhill about the operation.
 The Dam Busters, a 1955 film about the operation based on both the Gibson and Brickhill books

References

Notes

Bibliography

 – first hand accounts of the planning, preparation and execution of the raid.

 Bouquet, Tim 617 Going to War with Today's Dambusters. London: Orion (Orion Publishing Group Limited), 2012. 
 
 
 Halley, James J. The Squadrons of the Royal Air Force & Commonwealth, 1918–1988. Tonbridge, Kent, UK: Air-Britain (Historians) Ltd., 1988. .
 Jefford, C.G. RAF Squadrons, a Comprehensive Record of the Movement and Equipment of all RAF Squadrons and their Antecedents since 1912. Shrewsbury: Airlife Publishing, 1998 (second edition 2001). .
 Moyes, Philip J.R. Bomber Squadrons of the RAF and their Aircraft. London: Macdonald and Jane's (Publishers) Ltd., 1964 (new edition 1976). .
 Price, Nigel. Royal Air Force Salute - Tornado. Stamford: Key Publishing Ltd, 2019.

External links

 617 Squadron RAF Official Web Page
 RAFweb.org
 617 Squadron Dambusters site
 Royal Air Force Bomber Command 60th Anniversary: No. 617 Squadron
 617 Squadron – The Operational Record Book 1943 – 1945 (PDF) with additional information by Tobin Jones; Binx Publishing, Pevensey House, Sheep Street, Bicester. OX26 6JF. Acknowledgement is given to HMSO as holders of the copyright on the Operational Record Book
 16./17.05.1943 – "Operation Chastise"
 Pathe newsreel, 1963, 617 equipped with Blue Steel nuclear missiles
 Pathe newsreel, 1967, Dambusters re-union
 617 Squadron at the International Bomber Command Centre Digital Archive.

617 Squadron
Bomber squadrons of the Royal Air Force in World War II
Military units and formations established in 1943
1943 establishments in England